is a Japanese professional footballer who plays as a winger for  club Reims and the Japan national team.

Club career
After attending Kanagawa University for four years, Ito first became a Special Designated Player for Ventforet Kofu, and then obtained a new contract with the J1 League side.

His first season as a professional player attracted attention from Kashiwa Reysol. The Chiba club signed him in January 2016.

On 31 January 2019, Junya Ito moved from Kashiwa Reysol to Genk on a one-year loan deal. On 30 March 2020, Ito signed permanently with Genk on a three-year contract.

On 29 July 2022, Ito joined Ligue 1 club Reims.

Career statistics

Club

International

Scores and results list Japan's goal tally first, score column indicates score after each Ito goal.

Honours
Genk
Belgian First Division: 2018–19
Belgian Cup: 2020–21
Belgian Super Cup: 2019

Individual
Japan Pro-Footballers Association awards: Best XI (2022)

References

External links
Profile at Kashiwa Reysol

1993 births
Living people
Kanagawa University alumni
Association football people from Kanagawa Prefecture
Japanese footballers
Japanese expatriate footballers
J1 League players
Belgian Pro League players
Ligue 1 players
Ventforet Kofu players
Kashiwa Reysol players
K.R.C. Genk players
Stade de Reims players
Association football forwards
Japan international footballers
2019 AFC Asian Cup players
Japanese expatriate sportspeople in Belgium
Japanese expatriate sportspeople in France
Expatriate footballers in Belgium
Expatriate footballers in France
2022 FIFA World Cup players